The U.S. Army Aviation Center of Excellence formerly known as the Army Aviation Center and School, is the United States Army Aviation Branch's headquarters and training and development center, located at Fort Rucker, Alabama. The Aviation Center of Excellence coordinates and deploys aviation operations then trains aviation officers in a variety of topics, including classroom navigation instruction, aircraft piloting, and basic combat. The current commanding general is Major General Michael C. McCurry II.

The Center of Excellence includes three aviation brigades, the 1st Aviation Brigade, 110th Aviation Brigade, and 128th Aviation Brigade, various Army tenant organizations, and a Non-commissioned Officers' Academy.

History
Most training of pilots and mechanics for World War II army aviators were conducted by the Department of Air Training within the Field Artillery School at Henry Post Army Airfield, Oklahoma, although the Army Air Forces conducted some primary training of Army Aviation personnel. In early 1953, during the Korean War, the Department of Air Training at Post Field expanded and became the Army Aviation School. As a result of the expansion of both aviation and artillery training, Post Field became overcrowded so the Army decided to move the Army Aviation School to a different post. When no satisfactory permanent Army post was found, Camp Rucker was chosen as a temporary post. The Army Aviation School moved to Alabama in August 1954 and the first class began at Rucker that October.

On February 1,1955 the Army Aviation Center was officially established at Rucker. In the same year during the month of October, the post was given permanent status and changed their name from Camp Rucker to Fort Rucker. Before the mid-1950s, the Air Force had provided primary training for Army Aviation pilots and mechanics. In 1956, the U.S. Department of Defense gave the Army control over its preparation. Gary and Wolters Air Force Bases in Texas is where the Air Force had been conducting this training. Also transferred to the Army and lacking adequate facilities at Fort Rucker, Army Aviation continued primary fixed-wing training at Camp Gary until 1959 and primary rotary-wing training at Fort Wolters until 1973.

The pioneer African American flying instructor Milton Crenchaw taught at then-Camp Rucker from 1954 to 1966.

In 1956, the Army Aviation Center began assembling and testing weapons on helicopters. These tests were conducted while the Air Force still theoretically had exclusive responsibility for aerial fire support. This led to the development of armament systems for Army helicopters.

The 2005 the Base Realignment and Closure Commission proposed that Aviation logistics establishments at Fort Eustis should be consolidated with the Aviation Center and School at Fort Rucker. Although this did not take place, the U.S. Army Aviation Warfighting Center was eventually renamed the U.S. Army Aviation Center of Excellence on June 26, 2006.

Command and Directorates
The Unmanned Aerial Systems Center of Excellence (UAS COE), as the U.S. Army UAS Proponent's principle management agency, provides intensive, centralized total capacity management and Unmanned Aerial System integration.

The UAS COE provides "integration and coordination with all Army organizations, the joint services, and other Defense Department agencies to achieve the U.S. Army UAS strategy that includes concepts for current, emerging and future UAS interoperability with all manned and unmanned systems".

The 110th Aviation Brigade consists of four battalions using three different sites. The 1st Battalion, 11th Aviation Regiment, operates and manages air traffic control services for USAACE/Fort Rucker and the National Airspace System. The 1st Battalion, 14th Aviation Regiment all operate from Hanchey Army Heliport and conduct graduate-level training using the AH-64 Apache attack helicopter. The 1st Battalion, 212th Aviation Regiment operates from Lowe Army Heliport and Shell Army Heliport and conducts combat and night operational training, using OH-58 Kiowa, UH-1 Iroquois, and UH-60 Blackhawk helicopters. 1st Battalion, 223rd Aviation Regiment operates from Cairns Army Airfield and Knox Army Heliport and conducts flight training using the CH-47 Chinook helicopter and C-12 Huron aircraft.

Training
At the center, students learn to fly in aviation assets to assist United States forces with the 110th Aviation Brigade. Students that usually spend 15–18 months in aviation school, learning a wide range of subjects, and finally graduating with their "wings" or Aviator's Badge. When second lieutenants arrive at Fort Rucker after graduating from their commissioning source (USMA, ROTC, or OCS) they secure housing and they attend the two-month Basic Officer Leadership Course (BOLC) at Fort Rucker. Upon completion, they join the rest of their classmates who usually consists of Junior Warrant Officers that have previous enlisted experience.

Before starting academics, students must complete Dunker training and Army SERE (Survival, Evasion, Resistance, and Escape) school. After SERE, students transition to Initial Entry Rotary Wing Aeromedical Training (also known as "aeromed") at the U.S. Army School of Aviation Medicine. They learn subjects about flight and the human body. The information taught in these classes is tested frequently by the instructor pilots (IPs) throughout flight school.  Flight training varies by student and aircraft type but in general, students will complete basic flight training, instrument flight training, and basic combat skills training in a UH-72A Lakota.

List of commanding generals

References

Further reading
Lieutenant General John J. Tolson, Vietnam Studies: Airmobility 1961-1971, Department of the Army, WASHINGTON, D. C., 1973 (re-released 1989), Library of Congress Catalog Card Number 72-600371, First Printed 1973-CMH Pub 90-4

External links
The Aviation Technical Test Center (ATTC)
Official USAACE Website

United States Army aviation
Aviation schools in the United States
United States Army schools